The Washington Bridge was a cantilever truss bridge over the Missouri River at Washington, Missouri over which Route 47 passed between Franklin County, Missouri and Warren County, Missouri.  It has also been known as the Route 47 Missouri River Bridge.

The bridge was built in 1934. The bridge carried one lane of automobile traffic in each direction.

2007 inspection and subsequent replacement
The Missouri Department of Transportation shut down the bridge at 7:30 am on August 11, 2007, claiming to have discovered problems during regularly scheduled inspections.  As the bridge is similar to the I-35W Mississippi River bridge which collapsed in Minnesota, locals have speculated that the inspection and closure were related to this incident.  This resulted in a 60 mile (100 km) round-trip detour to the nearest open crossing over the Missouri river.  The bridge was soon reopened, but was again intermittently closed in the following weeks. MoDOT eventually completed a rehabilitation project in 2008 and 2009 as a stopgap measure until funding could be identified to replace the bridge.

Construction on a replacement bridge, located just to the west of the old bridge, began in 2016.  The new bridge features wider lanes, shoulders, and a pedestrian path which will open in spring 2019.  The new bridge opened to traffic on Monday, December 3, 2018.  The old bridge was demolished by explosives on April 11, 2019.

See also
List of crossings of the Missouri River

References

External links
Bridgehunter.com profile
MoDot site on new bridge

Buildings and structures in Franklin County, Missouri
Buildings and structures in Warren County, Missouri
Bridges completed in 1934
Road bridges in Missouri
Cantilever bridges in the United States
Truss bridges in the United States
1934 establishments in Missouri